Ewen Cameron (1 March 1921 – 12 January 1997) was a New Zealand cricketer. He played five first-class matches for Otago between 1953 and 1955. Cameron was a country schoolteacher who was famous locally for writing musicals. He was educated at Waitaki Boys' High School.

References

External links
 

1921 births
1997 deaths
New Zealand cricketers
Otago cricketers
Cricketers from Dunedin